is a town located in Yamagata Prefecture, Japan. ,  the town had an estimated population and a population density of 36 persons per km2.

Geography
Asahi is located in mountainous central Yamagata, and contains Mount Asahi within its borders. The Mogami River forms the western border of the town.

Neighboring municipalities
Yamagata Prefecture
Nagai
Ōe
Nishikawa
Oguni
Yamanobe
Shirataka

Climate
Asahi has a Humid continental climate (Köppen climate classification Dfa) with large seasonal temperature differences, with warm to hot (and often humid) summers and cold (sometimes severely cold) winters. Precipitation is significant throughout the year, but is heaviest from August to October. The average annual temperature in Asahi is 8.9 °C. The average annual rainfall is 1715 mm with September as the wettest month. The temperatures are highest on average in August, at around 22.7 °C, and lowest in January, at around -3.7 °C.

Demographics
Per Japanese census data, the population of Asahi has declined over the past 60 years.

History
The area of present-day Asahi was part of ancient Dewa Province. After the start of the Meiji period, the area became part of Nishimurayama District, Yamagata Prefecture. The town of Asahi was established on November 1, 1954, by the merger of the town of Miyajuku with the villages of Oya, and Nishiimogawa.

Economy
The economy of Asahi is based on agriculture.

Education
Asahi has three public elementary schools and one public middle school operated by the town government. The town does not have a high school.

Transportation

Railway
Asahi does not have any passenger railway service. The nearest station is Aterazawa Station in the neighboring town of Ōe.

Highway

Local attractions
Mount Asahi

References

External links

Official Website 

 
Towns in Yamagata Prefecture